Jack O'Judgment is a 1920 thriller novel by the British writer Edgar Wallace. It features a vigilante who takes action against a gang of blackmailers, using a mysterious identity and leaving the Jack of Clubs as a calling card.

References

1920 British novels
Novels by Edgar Wallace
British thriller novels